The Bhopal–Jodhpur is a daily fast express train which runs between Bhopal Junction railway station of Bhopal, the capital city of Madhya Pradesh and Jodhpur, 2nd largest city in Rajasthan.

Arrival and departure
Train number 14814 departs from Bhopal Junction daily at 1655 hrs., reaching Jodhpur the next day at 1830 hrs.
Train number 14813 departs from Jodhpur daily at 0940 hrs., reaching Bhopal Junction, the next day at 0920 hrs.

Routes and halts
The train goes via. Bina Junction–Guna–Kota and Jaipur.

The important halts of the train are :
 BHOPAL JUNCTION
 Salamatpur
 Sanchi
 Vidisha
 Gulabganj
 Ganj Basoda
 Kalhar
 Mandi Bamora
 Bina Junction
 Ashoknagar
 Mungaoli
 Guna
 Ruthiyai
 Chhabra Gugor
 Atru
 Baran
 Kota Junction
 Indergarh
 Sawai Madhopur
 Banasthali Niwai
 Jaipur Rajdhani
 Sambhar
 Makrana Junction
 Degana Junction
 JODHPUR

Coach composite
The train consist a total of 17 Coaches out of which :
 3 THIRD AC
 8 SLEEPER
 4 GENERAL
 2 LUGGAGE / GUARD VAN

Speed and frequency
The train runs with an average speed of 53 km/hour on daily basis from both the sites

Traction
Due to partial electrification of the route an Itarsi-based WAP 4 hauls the train from Bhopal Junction to till Kota Junction after which Abu Road-based WDM-3A hauls the train towards the remaining part of the journey till Jodhpur Junction.

Trivia
 This train is one of few passenger trains in India that have sleeper coaches.
 This train is the only connection of Bhopal with Jodhpur on a daily basis.

References
 

Transport in Bhopal
Transport in Jodhpur
Rail transport in Madhya Pradesh
Rail transport in Rajasthan
Transport in Jaipur
Slow and fast passenger trains in India